The 1999–2000 season was the 89th season in Hajduk Split’s history and their ninetieth in the Prva HNL. Their 3rd place finish in the 1998–99 season meant it was their 9th successive season playing in the Prva HNL.

Competitions

Overall record

Prva HNL

Classification

Results summary

Results by round

Results by opponent

Source: 1999–2000 Croatian First Football League article

Matches

Prva HNL

Source: hajduk.hr

Croatian Football Cup

Source: hajduk.hr

UEFA Cup

Source: hajduk.hr

Player seasonal records

Top scorers

Source: Competitive matches

Notes
1. Match as awarded to Hrvatski Dragovoljac because was Hajduk fielded suspended player.
2. Match abandoned after 81 minutes due to crowd trouble. Due this the match was awarded to Šibenik.
3. Match abandoned after 86 minutes due to mass fight between both clubs' supporters and the police. The match was a registered with 2:0 Hajduk's win and the club was punished by having their three matches behind closed doors.

See also
1999–2000 Croatian First Football League
1999–2000 Croatian Football Cup

References

External sources
 1999–2000 Prva HNL at HRnogomet.com
 1999–2000 Croatian Cup at HRnogomet.com
 1999–2000 UEFA Cup at rsssf.com

HNK Hajduk Split seasons
Hajduk Split